The Aguas Blancas Dam or Ladós Mill Dam is a dam in Aguas Blancas, Lavalleja, Uruguay, in the mountains of Abra de Zabaleta.

Region 

The dam is located in Aguas Blancas National Park adjoining a camping area administered by the Municipality of Lavalleja. In the vicinity of the dam, there is a Salesian convent of nuns that occupies the site of the first mill that generated hydropower in the country. The mill was established by an immigrant, Enrique Ladós, in 1860.

At the top of the hill is located the Virgen Blanca Chapel. Atop a mountain near the dam is the Senge Dzong Monastery Chagdud Center for Tibetan Vajrayana Buddhism.

Dams in Uruguay